Fabio Paratici (born 13 July 1972) is an Italian association football director and former footballer. Since June 2021, he is the managing director of for English club Tottenham Hotspur. He made his professional debut as a footballer with Piacenza in 1989, playing in Serie C1, the third tier of Italian football at the time. During his career, Paratici frequently moved throughout the lower divisions of Italian football, playing for various clubs in Serie C1 and Serie C2. He retired in 2004 at the age of 31, having played for 12 different clubs in 15 years. After his career ended, he remained involved in football through management. Before he joined Tottenham, Paratici worked as chief observer and head of scouting of Italian club Sampdoria and established a successful partnership with Giuseppe Marotta that was repeated at Juventus, Italy's most renowned club, where he worked as chief football officer for about eleven years.

Early life and footballer career 

Born in Borgonovo Val Tidone, in the province of Piacenza, Emilia Romagna, on 13 July 1972, Paratici began playing in Borgonovese, a club in his native town with which he won several youth championships. He was a right-back defender and midfielder; over the course of his career, he was deployed as a wild card in all roles in the defence and midfield. In 1986, he moved to Piacenza, where he became captain of the Campionato Nazionale Primavera team coached by  that included future star Filippo Inzaghi. In the following years, he was loaned to the lower divisions, first to Palazzolo and then to Fiorenzuola, where he remained for two seasons, and won a promotion to Serie C1.

At the end of the 1993–94 Serie C1 season, Paratici was involved in a car accident; he suffered numerous fractures that left him injured for a year. Paratici resumed activity in the  season as a starter with Pavia. He was not confirmed and briefly joined the Serie D with Sassuolo, and then played for Marsala. At the end of the season, he joined the Palermo of Massimo Morgia, who had coached him in Marsala. In 1998, he moved to Lecco for the  season. He then joined Savoia for the  season, and then moved to Giugliano for the  season. In 2002, he moved to Brindisi, where he won the Coppa Italia Serie C in 2003. He remained there until he ended his 15-year career at the age of 32 in 2004. On five occasions, he unsuccessfully reached the playoff finals in both Serie C1 and Serie C2.

Management 
Upon retiring, Paratici was hired as the chief observer and head of scouting for Sampdoria in 2004. During his tenure at Sampdoria, Paratici worked closely with the club's sporting director and subsequently its CEO, Giuseppe Marotta; the press called him Marotta's "right-hand man". Paratici described their work as "complementary". In August 2008, Paratici was allegedly approached by Urbano Cairo, owner and chairman of Torino, and offered the position of sporting director. Sampdoria and in particular Marotta were upset about these rumours, and accused Cairo of going behind their backs trying to lure Paratici, who was still under contract with Sampdoria until 2009.

In May 2010, Paratici moved from Sampdoria to Juventus, along with Marotta and coach Luigi Delneri. At Juventus, Paratici was appointed head of technical affairs and sporting director by chairman Andrea Agnelli. Sampdoria owner Riccardo Garrone was reported to be upset with Marotta for taking Paratici with him to Juventus, as Garrone had expected Paratici to inherit the role of director general at Sampdoria, and subsequently threatened to block any transfers to Juventus as retaliation. At Juventus, Paratici is notable for his transfer moves that brought the club a cycle of successes, including the Italian defender Andrea Barzagli (2011), who formed along with Leonardo Bonucci and Giorgio Chiellini a top defensive lineup that came to be known as the BBC from their initials, the Chilean midfielder Arturo Vidal (2011), and the forwards Argentines Carlos Tévez (2013) and Paulo Dybala (2015). In 2018, he played a key role in the purchase of the Portuguese star Cristiano Ronaldo from Real Madrid, which remains the most expensive transfer in the history of Italian football.

In November 2018, Paratici took over from Marotta as sporting director, and then took on the role of managing director from October 2020. Under his management, Juventus experienced one of the most victorious cycles in its history, with 19 total trophies, including an unprecedented, record-breaking nine consecutive Serie A (scudetto) titles, along with four consecutive Serie A–Coppa Italia national doubles and one national treble (Serie A–Coppa Italia–Supercoppa Italiana), as well as one UEFA Europa League semifinal and two UEFA Champions League finals.

On 12 June 2021, Premier League club Tottenham Hotspur announced that Paratici would be taking over as their managing director of football. In his first season, Tottenham improved from the seventh place to the fourth place of the 2021–22 Premier League season. Among those who made significant contributions to the club's successful top four challenge in the season were several former Juventus players. He signed former Juventus player and coach Antonio Conte and two players directly from his former club Juventus, Dejan Kulusevski and Rodrigo Bentancur, as well as former Juventus product Cristian Romero.

Capital gains investigation 
On 20 January 2023, as part of the Plusvalenza reopening of the investigation and citing new facts, the court of appeal of the Italian Football Federation (FIGC) accepted in part the appeal of the Federal Prosecutor's Office on the partial revocation of the acquittal decision of the same court from May 2022. Paratici was suspended for 30 months from holding office in Italian football as punishment for capital gain violations; its former club was docked 15 points. This was unprecedented for several reasons. Firstly, past judgements mainly hit the clubs and were limited to fines, not penalty points; secondly, capital gains are widespread not only in Italy but in the football world, are not illegal, and there is no law regulating them in football; thirdly, the FIGC prosecution changed the charge of Article 31, the one related to the budget that usually warrants fines, and added an Article 4 violation, which is related to loyalty, after two past judgements acquitted Juventus and all other clubs involved. Upon the publication of the court's motivations on 30 January 2023, the club and its involved directors, including Paratici, immediately announced they would appeal to the Italian National Olympic Committee (CONI), which would rule on whether there were defects of form, not on the sentence's merit, and thus the club, which denied any wrongdoing, focused on such issues; the CONI appeal was officially deposited on 28 February 2023. In March 2023, a preliminary hearing about the Prisma case is scheduled to be held and determinate whether the case would be closed or not.

In its sentence on 8 March 2023, the TAR criticized the FIGC, which declined to be a party in the CONI appeal, and ruled that the document must be sent to the defenses. The FIGC appealed to Italy's Council of State to have the TAR's sentence revoked on the grounds that Juventus appealed to the TAR when this is available after the three instances of judgement are exhausted; the appeal came from Paratici and Cherubini, not the club, and the FIGC's appeal was rejected. The same body announced that on 23 March it would rule on the merit of the FIGC's actions and whether the document can be used in the CONI appeal later in the month. While the note did not name Juventus, it acknowledged the difficulty of an objective value in regards to capital gains; some observers questioned why the defences were not given access if it was irrelevant. Alongside the other parties, Paratici received the note preceding this document, dated 31 March 2021, on 14 March 2023; this time, the FIGC made no appeal or opposition and delivered the document, which did not name Juventus but discussed the difficulty of determining an objective value of traded players.

Notes

References 

1972 births
Association football defenders
Calcio Lecco 1912 players
F.C. Pavia players
Italian footballers
Juventus F.C. non-playing staff
Lega Pro Seconda Divisione players
Living people
Novara F.C. players
Palermo F.C. players
Piacenza Calcio 1919 players
S.S.C. Giugliano players
Serie C players
Tottenham Hotspur F.C. directors and chairmen
U.S. Fiorenzuola 1922 S.S. players
U.S. Sassuolo Calcio players